South Rawajitu (Indonesian: Rawajitu Selatan) is a district located in the Tulang Bawang Regency of Lampung in Sumatra, Indonesia.

Borders 

The borders of South Rawajitu District are as follows:

References 

Tulang Bawang Regency
Districts of Lampung